Marketa Goetz-Stankiewicz (born Markéta Götzová; 15 February 1927 – 6 November 2022) was a Canadian scholar and translator, best-known for her work on Czech literature. Born to a German Bohemian mother and a Jewish father, she won the 1988 Ordo Scriptores Bohemici prize, 2000 Medal of Merit, and 2016 George Theiner Prize. 

Radio Prague International described her as

Life
Markéta Götzová was born in Liberec. From 1935 to 1948, she lived in Místek where she studied at a German School.

In 1948, her family emigrated to Toronto. She graduated from University of Toronto, and Columbia University. From 1959, she taught German literature at University of British Columbia, and was known for her scholarship on samizdat and dissident writers such as Václav Havel.

In 1965, she married Polish-born political scientist Władysław Stankiewicz. From 1973 to 1989, she travelled annually to Prague, and met many Czech writers, promoting their work.

She died at her home in Vancouver on 6 November 2022, aged 96.

Works
 Markéta Goetz-Stankiewicz (ed) The Vanĕk Plays: Four Authors, One Character. Vancouver: University of British Columbia Press, 1987. 
 Good-Bye Samizdat: Twenty Years of Czechoslovak Underground Writing, Northwestern University Press, 1992.

References

External links
 Marketa Goetz-Stankiewicz  Memory of Nations
 Markéta Goetz-Stankiewicz: of unknown origin in a strange wood without leaves Radio Prague International, 09/24/2016

1927 births
2022 deaths
People from Liberec
Czechoslovak emigrants to Canada
Canadian women historians